The Witch of Endor ( baʿălaṯ-ʾōḇ bəʿĒyn Dōr, "she who owns the ʾōḇ of Endor") is a woman who, according to the Hebrew Bible, was consulted by Saul to summon the spirit of the prophet Samuel. Saul wished to receive advice on defeating the Philistines in battle, after prior attempts to consult God through sacred lots and other means had failed. When summoned, however, the spirit of Samuel only delivers a prophecy of doom against Saul. This event occurs in the First Book of Samuel; it is also mentioned in the deuterocanonical Book of Sirach.

Etymology
The woman of the story is called in biblical Hebrew אֵשֶׁת בַּעֲלַת־אֹוב בְּעֵין דֹּור (ʾēšeṯ baʿălaṯ-ʾōḇ bəʿĒyn Dōr), "a woman, possessor of an ’ōḇ at Endor". The word אֹ֖וב ’ōḇ has been suggested by Harry Hoffner to refer to a ritual pit for summoning the dead from the netherworld, based on parallels in other Near Eastern and Mediterranean cultures. The word has cognates in other regional languages (cf. Sumerian ab, Akkadian âbu, Hittite a-a-bi, Ugaritic ib) and the witch of Endor's ritual has parallels in Babylonian and Hittite magical texts as well as the Odyssey. Other suggestions for a definition of ’ōḇ include a familiar spirit, a talisman, or a wineskin, in reference to ventriloquism.

In the Greek Septuagint, she is called ἐγγαστρίμυθος ἐν Αενδωρ engastrímythos en Aendōr, while the Latin Vulgate has pythonem in Aendor, both terms referencing then-contemporary pagan oracles.

The witch also claims to see "elohim arising" ("elohim" is plural but the apparition becomes singular later) from the ground, using the word typically translated as "god(s)" to refer to the spirit of the dead. This is also paralleled by the use of the Akkadian cognate word ilu "god" in a similar fashion.

Biblical narrative

When the prophet Samuel dies, he is buried in Ramah (1 Sam 25:1; 28:3). Saul, the king of Israel, seeks advice from God in choosing a course of action against the assembled forces of the Philistine army. He receives no answer from dreams, prophets, or the Urim and Thummim. Having previously driven out all necromancers and magicians from Israel, Saul searches for a witch anonymously and is told one is living in the village of Endor. Saul disguises himself and crosses through enemy lines to visit her, asking her to raise Samuel. The woman at first refuses, on account of Saul's edict against sorcery, but Saul assures her that she will not be punished. 

The woman summons a spirit, and when it appears, she works out who Saul is and screams, "Why have you deceived me? You are Saul!". Saul assures her that no harm will come to her, and asks what she sees. She says that she sees "elohim" (plural word gods) rising (plural verb). Then, Saul asks what "he" (singular) looks like, and she describes an old man wrapped in a robe. Saul bows down to the spirit, but is apparently unable to see it himself. The spirit complains of being disturbed, berates Saul for disobeying God, and predicts Saul's downfall. The living Samuel has already said Saul would have his kingship removed, but this spirit adds that Israel's army will be defeated, and Saul and his sons will be "with me" tomorrow. Saul collapses in terror; the woman comforts him, and prepares him a meal of a fatted calf to restore his strength.

The following day, the Israelite army is defeated as prophesied: Saul is wounded by the Philistines, and commits suicide by falling on his sword.  (Later, a young Amalekite hoping to impress David will falsely claim he delivered the death blow, and David will execute him.) In 1 Chronicles, it is stated that Saul's death was, in part, a punishment for seeking advice from a medium rather than from God.

Interpretations

Judaism

In the Septuagint (2nd century BC) the woman is described as a ventriloquist, possibly reflecting the consistent view of the Alexandrian translators that demons do not exist. On the other hand, the Hebrew Book of Sirach, composed in the same period, represents it as a fact that Samuel prophesied to Saul after his death. Josephus, writing in the 1st century AD, also appears to find the story completely credible.

The Yalkut Shimoni (11th century) identifies the anonymous witch as the mother of Abner. Based upon the witch's claim to have seen something, and Saul having heard a disembodied voice, the Yalkut suggests that necromancers are able to see the spirits of the dead but are unable to hear their speech, while the person for whom the deceased was summoned hears the voice but fails to see anything.

According to Antoine Augustin Calmet, writing in the 18th century:

Christianity

The Church Fathers and some modern Christian writers have debated the theological issues raised by this text, which would appear at first sight to affirm that it is possible (though forbidden) for humans to summon the spirits of the dead by magic.

King James, in his philosophical treatise Daemonologie (1597), rejected the theory that the witch was performing an act of ventriloquism, but also denied that she had truly summoned the spirit of Samuel. He wrote that the Devil is permitted at times to take on the likeness of the saints, citing 2 Corinthians 11:14, which says that "Satan can transform himself into an Angel of light". James describes the witch of Endor as "Saul's Pythonese", likening her to the ancient Greek oracle Pythia. He asserts the reality of witchcraft, arguing that if such things were not possible, they would not be prohibited in Scripture:

Other medieval glosses to the Bible also suggested that what the witch summoned was not the ghost of Samuel, but a demon taking his shape or an illusion crafted by the witch. Martin Luther, who believed that the dead were unconscious, read that it was "the Devil's ghost", whereas John Calvin read that "it was not the real Samuel, but a spectre."

Antoine Augustin Calmet briefly mentions the witch of Endor in his Treatise on the Apparitions of Spirits (1759), among other scriptural proofs of "the reality of magic". He acknowledges that this interpretation is disputed, and says that he will deduce nothing from the passage "except that this woman passed for a witch, [and] that Saul esteemed her such".

Since this passage states the witch made a loud cry in fear when she saw Samuel's spirit, some interpreters reject the suggestion that the witch was responsible for summoning Samuel's spirit, claiming instead that this was the work of God. Joyce Baldwin (1989) writes that "the incident does not tell us anything about the veracity of claims to consult the dead on the part of mediums, because the indications [of the woman’s behavior] are that this was an extraordinary event for her, and a frightening one, because she was not in control." 

Grenville Kent summarises two main historical interpretations: one, that Samuel really appeared, either bodily or in resurrected form; two, that Samuel was impersonated by a demon in order to destroy Saul.  He argues that the latter view matches the text.

Spiritualism

Spiritualists have taken the story as evidence of spirit mediumship in ancient times. The story has been cited in debates between Spiritualist apologists and Christian critics. "The woman of Endor was a medium, respectable, honest, law-abiding, and far more Christ-like than" Christian critics of Spiritualism, asserted one Chicago Spiritualist paper in 1875.

Cultural references

The story of Saul's consultation with the witch of Endor has frequently been set to music, with many works expanding on the character of the witch. One early example is In guiltie night, an oratorio written by Robert Ramsey in the 1630s, which formed the basis of a better-known work of the same title by Henry Purcell in 1691.

The witch also appears in Mors Saulis et Jonathae by Charpentier (c. 1682), Saul by George Frideric Handel (1738), Die Könige in Israel by Ferdinand Ries (1837), and Le Roi David by Honegger (1921). Notable operas featuring the character include David et Jonathas by Charpentier (1688) and Saul og David by Carl Nielsen (1902). In 1965, the Martha Graham Dance Company premiered The Witch of Endor, a one act ballet with music by William Schuman. This was subsequently reworked into a short symphonic-style piece by Moondog, for his eponymous 1969 album.

Poetic works retelling the story include "Saul" by Lord Byron, published in his 1815 collection Hebrew Melodies, and "In Endor" by Shaul Tchernichovsky (1893), a major work of modern Hebrew poetry which paints Saul as a sympathetic figure. Rudyard Kipling, a year after the death of his son at the Battle of Loos, wrote a poem called "En-Dor" (published 1919), using the story as a device to criticise contemporary mediums.

In theatre, the witch of Endor figures in Laurence Housman's 1944 play Samuel the Kingmaker, and has a central role in Howard Nemerov's 1961 play Endor. The character has been portrayed cinematically by Israeli actor Dov Reiser in the 1976 television film The Story of David, and by Belgian actress Lyne Renée in the 2016 series Of Kings and Prophets.

References

Further reading 
 
 Kent, G. J. R. (2014). ”Call Up Samuel”: Who appeared to the Witch at En-Dor? (1 Sam 28:3-25). Andrews University Seminary Studies, 52(2), 141-160.  https://digitalcommons.andrews.edu/auss/ https://research.avondale.edu.au/theo_papers/196/

External links

 Medium of Endor: From the Jewish Encyclopedia

 
11th-century BC women
Books of Samuel people
Psychics
Women in the Hebrew Bible
Unidentified people
Mediumship
Ventriloquists
Samuel
Unnamed people of the Bible